The 1st Ohio Independent Cavalry Battalion was a battalion of cavalry in the Union Army during the American Civil War.  With the addition of a second Battalion its designation changed to that of Regiment, the 11th Ohio Cavalry in July, 1863.

Commanders
 Lt. Col. William O. Collins

See also

 List of Ohio Civil War units
 Ohio in the Civil War

References
 Dyer, Frederick H. A Compendium of the War of the Rebellion (Des Moines, IA:  Dyer Pub. Co.), 1908.

Footnotes

External links
 1st Ohio Independent Cavalry Battalion
  11th Ohio Cavalry, Rocky Mountain Cavalry
  Civil War Archive: Union Regimental Histories, Ohio, 1st Independent Battalion Cavalry
  Center for Archival Collections: Cavalry Units: 11th Ohio Volunteer Cavalry

Military units and formations established in 1861
Units and formations of the Union Army from Ohio
Military units and formations of the United States in the Indian Wars
1861 establishments in Ohio
Military units and formations disestablished in 1863
1863 disestablishments in the United States